Rodeo Waltz is a 1993 album by the US country duo Sweethearts of the Rodeo. The album was their first for Sugar Hill Records, and it did not include any singles.

Reception 

In his Allmusic review, critic Kelly McCartney wrote of the album, "In an age when country and pop are almost indistinguishable, it's nice to have a few artists dusting off some good, old tunes and offering them up to a new generation of fans."

Mike Boehm of the Los Angeles Times wrote, "The material moves from old-line honky-tonk and country classics (a good, springy treatment of Johnny Cash's rockin' "Get Rhythm") to contributions from contemporary country songwriter Don Schlitz."

Track listing

Personnel

Sweethearts of the Rodeo
Kristine Arnold – vocals
Janis Gill – vocals, acoustic guitar

Additional Musicians
Sam Bush – mandolin
Bobby Clark – mandolin
Stuart Duncan – fiddle
Vince Gill – electric guitar
Roy Huskey Jr. – bass guitar, upright bass
Kenny Malone – drums, percussion
Terry McMillan – harmonica
Joey Miskulin – accordion
Pete Wasner – keyboards

Track information and credits verified from Discogs, AllMusic, and the album's liner notes.

References

1993 albums
Sweethearts of the Rodeo albums
Sugar Hill Records albums